The Door of Return is an emblem of African Renaissance and is a pan-African initiative that seeks to launch a new era of cooperation between Africa and its diaspora in the 21st century. The initiative is Chaired by the Hon. Timothy E. McPherson Jr., Minister of Finance for the Accompong Maroons in Jamaica, and is being spearheaded across Africa in cooperation with Nigeria, Ghana and Zimbabwe as part of the United Nations's International Decade for People of African Descent. The name is a reference to the "Door of No Return", a monument commemorating the transatlantic slave trade.

On 24 August 2017, Nigeria erected the first symbolic Door of Return monument as part of the Diaspora Festival in Badagry. The symbolic monument was unveiled under the auspices of the Hon. Abike Dabiri, Senior Special Assistant to the President on Diaspora and Foreign Affairs.  A permanent monument is to be unveiled in August 2018, which is when Accompong will also unveil its permanent monument. 

The Door of Return initiative is expected to advance African economic development in areas of tourism, infrastructure and renewable energy. The erection of Door of Return Monuments are intended to promote inter-continental travel and act as a symbol of Africa’s openness to the Diaspora.

See also
African Americans in Africa
Back-to-Africa movement
Diaspora tourism
Genealogy tourism (Africa)
Return to roots
Right of return (Ghana)
Year of Return, Ghana 2019

References

African and Black nationalism
African diaspora
Slavery memorials